The Politics XXI was a Portuguese left-wing political party. It was founded by former members of the Portuguese Communist Party and the Portuguese Democratic Movement/Democratic Electoral Commissions.

In 1998, the party decided to merge with other political left parties in order to found the Left Bloc. On 2 April 2008, the party was dissolved due to the good results obtained by the Left Bloc, and became the political association Fórum Manifesto.

1994 establishments in Portugal
2008 disestablishments in Portugal
Defunct socialist parties in Portugal
Democratic socialist parties in Europe
Left Bloc (Portugal)
Political parties disestablished in 2008
Political parties established in 1994
Progressive parties